Goodyear Village (O'odham: Valin Dak) is a census-designated place (CDP) in Pinal County, Arizona, United States, located in the Gila River Indian Community. The population was 457 at the 2010 census.

Demographics 

As of the census of 2010, there were 457 people living in the CDP. The population density was 136.1 people per square mile. The racial makeup of the CDP was 6% White, 1% Black or African American, 91% Native American, 2% from other races, and 2% from two or more races. 26% of the population were Hispanic or Latino of any race.

Notes

Census-designated places in Pinal County, Arizona
Gila River Indian Community